Joseph H. Hoadley (July 1863 – ?) was an American financier charged with fraud on several occasions. He was president of International Power Co.

Biography
He was born in San Francisco, California in July 1863. By 1906 he was a defendant before the New York Supreme Court in a trial with Elizabeth C. Prall.

In 1916 he was sentenced to Ludlow Street Jail, when the police came to detain him at his house, and suspect that he escaped through a secret tunnel.

In 1918 he lost a lawsuit and was ordered to pay $999,389 to the American & British Mfg. Co.

His wife died by suicide in 1919 by inhaling illuminating gas. The police investigated her death as a possible murder. He was then ordered out of his house for non payment of his mortgage. The house was sold, and he claimed to the court that he had an arrangement with the new owner where he was not required to pay rent.

In 1932 he was arrested and convicted of cheque fraud for $1,037, and sentenced to three months in a workhouse.

References

1863 births
Year of death missing
American financial businesspeople
American people convicted of fraud